Health and Efficiency is a British sitcom that was originally broadcast from 30 December 1993 to 10 February 1995 on BBC1 for a total of 12 episodes over 2 series. It was written by Andrew Marshall, writer of the sitcom 2point4 Children.

The show starred Gary Olsen and Roger Lloyd-Pack who both starred in 2point4 Children, as well as Victor McGuire and Deborah Norton.

The setting was a hospital and each episode was 30 minutes in length.

Cast
 Gary Olsen – Dr. Michael Jimson
 Felicity Montagu – Dr. Kate Russell
 Roger Lloyd-Pack – Reg Rexis
 Deborah Norton – Diana Ewerts
 Victor McGuire – Dr. Phil Brooke
 Adjoa Andoh – Sister Beth Williams
 Jennifer Gibson – Nurse Mandy

Episodes

Series One

Series Two

References
 
 Health and Efficiency at the BFI Film and Television Database

1993 British television series debuts
1995 British television series endings
1990s British sitcoms
BBC television sitcoms
1990s British medical television series
English-language television shows
Television shows set in London